Giacomo Portas (born 27 September 1959 in Iglesias, Sardinia) is an Italian politician.

Biography
Giacomo Portas was born in Iglesias, but he later moved to Turin.

In 2005 founded the Moderates' party, rooted mainly in Piedmont and allied with the centre-left.

In 2008 he was elected to the Chamber of Deputies in the Democratic Party's list. He was re-elected deputy also in 2013 and 2018, still into the Democratic Party.

In 2019 he joined the Italia Viva's parliamentary group.

References

1959 births
Living people
Deputies of Legislature XVI of Italy
Deputies of Legislature XVII of Italy
Deputies of Legislature XVIII of Italy
Italia Viva politicians